Ted Prappas (November 14, 1955 – April 22, 2022), was a driver in the CART Championship Car series.  He raced in the 1991-1992 seasons with 26 career starts, including the 1992 Indianapolis 500.  He finished in the top ten 4 times and his best career finish was in 6th position at the 1991 Grand Prix of Long Beach.  He finished the 1991 season as runner-up to Jeff Andretti for Rookie of the Year.

Before moving to CART, Prappas was the 1986 West Coast Atlantic Racing champion and was runner up in the 1990 Indy Lights championship.  He started racing in Super Vee in 1983, in a car bought for him by James Stewart, who had previously hired his mother as his business agent.

Prappas died April 22, 2022, aged 66 of colon cancer.

Career results

American Racing Series

CART

References

External links
Driver DataBase Profile
Profile at ChampCar stats
Profile at Racing Reference

1955 births
2022 deaths
American racing drivers
Champ Car drivers
Indianapolis 500 drivers
Indy Lights drivers
SCCA Formula Super Vee drivers
Atlantic Championship drivers
Sportspeople from Santa Monica, California
Racing drivers from California
Racing drivers from Los Angeles
Deaths from colorectal cancer